The Rock House, also known as the Bowman Gray House, is a historic home located in Roaring Gap, Alleghany County, North Carolina It was designed by architects Northup and O'Brien and built in 1929, and is a rambling, rock and chestnut bark-clad design that epitomizes the Rustic Revival style. Also on the property is a contributing Garage/Servant's Quarters (c. 1929).

It was listed on the National Register of Historic Places in 2004.

References

Houses on the National Register of Historic Places in North Carolina
Houses completed in 1929
Houses in Alleghany County, North Carolina
National Register of Historic Places in Alleghany County, North Carolina